Lush is a surname.

List of people with the surname 

 Anne Lush (1857–1937), New Zealand painter
 Archibald Lush (1890s–1974), Welsh school inspector
 Billy Lush (born 1981), American actor
 Billy Lush (baseball) (1873–1951), American baseball player and college sports coach
 David Lush (1887–1960), Canadian politician
 Ernie Lush (1885–1937), American baseball player
 Jay Laurence Lush (1896–1982), American geneticist
 Jane Lush, British worker
 Johnny Lush (1885–1946), American baseball player
 John Alfred Lush (1815–1888), English Liberal politician
 Julie Anthony (singer) (Julie Moncrief Lush, born 1949), Australian entertainer
 Marcus Lush (born 1965), New Zealand politician, television and radio presenter
 Richard Lush, British-born Australian recording engineer and producer
 Rebecca Lush (born 1972), British activist
 Robert Lush (1807–1881), English judge
 Samuel S. Lush (1783–1841), American lawyer and politician
 Stephen Lush (1753–1825), American politician
 Shannon Lush, Australian best-selling author
 Tom Lush (born 1939), Canadian politician

See also 

 Lusher
 Lash (surname)

Surnames of British Isles origin
Surnames of English origin
Surnames of Welsh origin
English-language surnames
Surnames of Norman origin